The Institut de recherche en informatique fondamentale (IRIF; English: Fundamental Computing Research Institute) is a French research institute supporting advanced research in computer science. It is located in Paris. It is a public research institute in a partnership with the Université Paris Cité.

Presentation
IRIF is a research unit co-funded by CNRS and Université Paris Cité hosting one Inria project-team.

IRIF is a member of the Computer Science UFR of Université Paris Cité and also welcomes several members of the Mathematics UFR. Finally, IRIF is associated with the doctoral school of mathematical sciences of Paris Centre (ED 386).

As of January 2019, IRIF has about 100 permanent members, divided into 48 teacher-researchers, 27 CNRS researchers, 5 INRIA researchers, 8 emeritus members and 7 administrative or technical staff.

Research
The research conducted at IRIF is based on the study and understanding of the foundations of all computer science, in order to provide innovative solutions to the current and future challenges of digital sciences. 

IRIF is renown for its contributions to the design and analysis of algorithms, the study of computational and data representation models, the foundations of programming languages, software development, verification, and certification. IRIF also conducts interdisciplinary research taking advantage of its scientific approach. 

IRIF relies on mathematical concepts developed and studied within it, particularly in combinatorics, graph theory, logic and algebra. Its work also contributes directly to mathematics, including number theory, combinatorial physics, probability theory, category, proof theory, and computer assisted mathematical proofs.

Structure
IRIF is divided into nine thematic teams grouped in three research poles: 

 Algorithms and discrete structures
 Algorithms and complexity
 Combinatorics
 Distributed computing
 Theory and algorithmics of graphs

 Automata, structures and verification
 Automata and applications
 Modeling and verification

 Proofs, programs and systems
 Algebra and computation
 Analysis and conception of systems
 Proofs and programs

Members' distinctions
Six IRIF members have received grants from the European Research Council (ERC), five are members of the Institut Universitaire de France (IUF) and two (Giuseppe Castagna and Jean-Éric Pin) are members of the Academia Europæa.

 Frédéric Magniez held the 2020-2021 Chair of Computer Science and Digital Science at the Collège de France
 Pierre-Louis Curien was awarded the Inria Grand Prix of the Academy of Sciences in 2020
 Claire Mathieu held the 2017-2018 Chair of Computer Science and Digital Science at the Collège de France. She was awarded the CNRS silver medal in 2019. She is a member of the Academy of Sciences since 2020
 Jean-Éric Pin received the Arto Salomaa Award in 2018
 Ahmed Bouajjani was awarded the Carl Friedrich von Siemens Prize by the Humboldt Foundation in 2018
 Pierre Fraigniaud was awarded the CNRS silver medal in 2012, the prize for innovation in distributed computing in 2014
 Thomas Colcombet got the bronze medal in 2010

Former members
 Marcel-Paul Schützenberger, Louis Nolin, André Lentin and Maurice Nivat are the founders of LITP and former leading members of LIAFA, successor of LITP.
 Dominique Perrin was director of LIAFA, Guy Cousineau was director of PPS.

References

External links
 Official website 

Research institutes in France
Buildings and structures in Paris
Education in Paris